Danmarks Nationalbank issues banknotes of the Danish Krone (kr.) and has replaced the 1997 banknote series as of 24 May 2011.

The issue of the 1997 series commenced on 10 March 1997 with the debut of the 200 kr. denomination, issued to bridge the gap between the 100 kr. and 500 kr. denominations.

Commencing on 27 November 2002 the Nationalbank improved the security features for future banknotes of the 1997 series, starting with the 100 kr. denomination.

A new series of notes is currently being issued: Banknotes of Denmark, 2009 series. The first was the 50 kr. banknote on 11 August 2009.

The 50 kroner note 
Issued on 7 May 1999 – updated on 25 August 2005 – out of print as of 11 August 2009.

The Danish 50 kroner bill (DKK50) is a denomination of Danish currency.  Danish writer Karen Blixen is featured on the front side of the bill, while the design on the reverse is inspired by a centaur from Landet Church on the island of Tåsinge.  The current version for this bill came into circulation on 25 August 2005.

The face of the banknote has a portrait of writer Karen Blixen (17 April 1885 to 7 September 1962). She is acclaimed for writing Seven Gothic Tales (1935) and her memoirs Out of Africa (1937). The face of the banknote is also decorated with flowers, of which Karen Blixen was very fond.

The image on the reverse of the 50 krone banknote is inspired by a stone relief from Landet Church on the island of Tåsinge

The 50 krone banknote has the word "femti", not "halvtreds" which is the usual Danish word for fifty. Femti is a word used for cheques. The Danish National bank first used it on the 50 krone banknote issued in 1957, and the 1997 banknote is thus the third to use this word. However, on the new banknote issued on 11 August 2009 the word "halvtreds" is used instead of "femti".

The 100 kroner note 
Issued on 22 November 1999 – updated on 27 November 2002 – out of print as of 4 May 2010.

The Danish 100-kroner bill (DKK100) is a denomination of Danish currency.  Danish composer Carl Nielsen is featured on the front side of the bill and a basilisk from Tømmerby Church is featured on the reverse.  This version began circulation on 27 November 2002.

The face of the banknote has a portrait of the composer Carl Nielsen (9 June 1865 to 3 October 1931). Carl Nielsen was an orchestra leader, conductor, and music teacher, but above all a very versatile composer.  He is known for writing operas such as Maskarade (1905–1906), and many symphonic works.

The reverse of the 100-kroner banknote shows a basilisk from Tømmerby Church in Vester Hanherred in northern Denmark. (A basilisk is part snake, part dragon, and part rooster. Basilisk means "little king" and the figure is recognisable by its crown.) Around half of all Danish banknotes in circulation are 100-kroner banknotes, making it the principal banknote in the series.

The 100-kroner bill is sometimes referred to as a hund (Danish for 'dog'), from a shortening of the word hundrede (a hundred).

The 200 kroner note 
Issued on 10 March 1997 – updated on 9 April 2003 – out of print as of 19 October 2010.

The Danish 200 kroner bill (DKK200) is a denomination of Danish currency.  Danish actress Johanne Luise Heiberg is featured on the front side of the bill, while a lion from the apse of Viborg Cathedral is featured on the reverse side.  The current version of this bill came into circulation on 9 April 2003.

The face of the banknote has a portrait of Johanne Luise Heiberg (22 November 1812 to 21 December 1890). She was one of the greatest Danish actresses of the 19th century and took the Royal Theatre in Copenhagen by storm on countless occasions. Her autobiography Et liv genoplevet i erindringen (A Life Relived in Memory) is a major literary work from the Danish golden age.

The motif on the reverse of the 200 kroner banknote is a lion from the apse of Viborg Cathedral.

The 500 kroner note 
Issued on 12 September 1997 – updated on 24 September 2003 – out of print as of 15 February 2011.

The Danish 500 kroner bill (DKK500) is a denomination of Danish currency.  Danish nuclear physicist Niels Bohr (7 October 1885 to 18 November 1962) is featured on the front of the bill.  Niels Bohr was a major contributor to modern science and was very influential on the development of modern nuclear physics. He won many awards, including the Nobel Prize for Physics in 1922.

The Danish Central Bank was heavily criticized by the Danish Cancer Society for choosing a portrait of Dr Bohr smoking a pipe, in an age of smoking bans.

A knight in armour fighting a dragon is featured on the reverse side. The design comes from a stone relief from Lihme Church in northern Jutland.

The current version of this bill came into circulation on 24 September 2003.

The 500 kroner bill is sometimes referred to as a plovmand (ploughman) because previous issues of the bill featured a picture of a man with a plough.

The 1000 kroner note 
Issued on 18 September 1998 – updated on 25 November 2004.

The Danish thousand-kroner bill (DKK1000) is a denomination of Danish currency.  Danish artists Anna and Michael Ancher are featured on the front side of the bill.  It is at present the largest denomination in circulation, and the current version came into circulation on 25 November 2004.  The banknote is 165 mm x 72 mm.

The front of the banknote has a double portrait of artists Anna and Michael Ancher (18 August 1859 to 15 April 1935, and 9 June 1849 to 19 September 1927). The couple are known for their paintings depicting everyday life in the fishing town of Skagen. The portraits featured on the banknote were inspired by two paintings by Danish artist Peder Severin Krøyer made in 1884, and originally hung on the walls in the dining room at Brøndums Hotel in Skagen. The anchor background pattern on the banknote does not directly refer to the artists' surname (anker means anchor in Danish), but to a necklace worn by Anna.

The back of the banknote shows a tournament scene from a sepulchral monument in Bislev Church in northern Jutland.

The 1000 kroner bill is sometimes referred to as a tudse (toad), from a word play on the word tusinde (a thousand).

Security features 
The design of each banknote in the series incorporates various security devices. When the banknotes are tilted, various motifs appear in the hologram. Also, fluorescent colours, which are visible under ultraviolet light, are used on both sides of the banknotes.

50 kroner: The hologram alternately shows the figure 50, the Roman numeral L and a flower. Fluorescent effects: Centaur on obverse and green print on the reverse.

100 kroner: Hologram: Two musical notes, the Roman numeral "C." and the number "100." When the note is tilted the "C" grows larger and a rainbow appears. Using a magnifying glass, it is possible to see a microprinted "100" in the outer line around the letter "C." Fluorescent effects: Basilisk on obverse and orange print on the reverse.

200 kroner: Hologram: A lion, the Roman numeral "CC," and the number "200." When the note is tilted the "CC" grows larger. Fluorescent effects: Lion on obverse and green print on the reverse.

500 kroner: Hologram: An atom, the number 500, and the Roman numeral "D". The current version of the 500 kroner banknote was designed to be very hard to counterfeit. The hologram cannot be colour copied. Fluorescent effects: Knight on obverse and orange print on the reverse.

1000 kroner: Hologram: A palette, the number 1000 and the Roman numeral "M". Fluorescent effects: Horseman on obverse and orange print on the reverse.

During 2002–2005, additional security features were added.

References 

 

Banknotes of Denmark
Portraits on banknotes